Target Two Point Zero was an interest rate challenge for students in the UK set by the Bank of England and The Times.  Students aged 16 to 18 were asked to analyse the economic outlook and recommend what interest rate should be set.  The students made a 15-minute presentation and were judged by Bank of England staff, through three rounds with an ultimate winner being selected in a national final.  The Bank of England announced that 2017 was the last year of the competition.

The challenge 
Target Two Point Zero invited students aged 16 to 18 to take on the role of the Monetary Policy Committee to analyse current economic conditions in the UK and the outlook for inflation. Teams of four students created a formal presentation that was delivered to a panel of judges from the Bank of England. The presentations were concluded with a recommendation on exactly what interest rate the team would set in order to achieve the UK government's inflation target of 2.0% CPI.

Following the initial presentation, which lasted a maximum of 15 minutes, the judges had the opportunity to ask questions about what had been said. They might have asked the students to justify or clarify certain aspects of their interpretation of the economic conditions.

Structure of the competition 
The challenge had three identical rounds: regional heats, area finals and the national final. There was a sufficient time lapse between rounds to compel teams to change and update their presentation to take into account of new economic statistics, or the MPC’s own interest rate decisions.

Winners of the competition

See also 
Monetary Policy

References

External links
bankofengland.co.uk
business.timesonline.co.uk

Bank of England
Inflation in the United Kingdom